In geometry, the polar sine generalizes the sine function of angle to the vertex angle of a polytope. It is denoted by psin.

Definition

n vectors in n-dimensional space 

Let v1, ..., vn (n ≥ 1) be non-zero Euclidean vectors in n-dimensional space (Rn) that are directed from a vertex of a parallelotope, forming the edges of the parallelotope. The polar sine of the vertex angle is:

where the numerator is the determinant

which equals the signed hypervolume of the parallelotope with vector edges

and where the denominator is the n-fold product

of the magnitudes of the vectors, which equals the hypervolume of the n-dimensional hyperrectangle with edges equal to the magnitudes of the vectors ||v1||, ||v2||, ... ||vn|| rather than the vectors themselves. Also see Ericksson.

The parallelotope is like a "squashed hyperrectangle", so it has less hypervolume than the hyperrectangle, meaning (see image for the 3d case):

as for the ordinary sine, with either bound being reached only in the case that all vectors are mutually orthogonal.

In the case n = 2, the polar sine is the ordinary sine of the angle between the two vectors.

In higher dimensions

A non-negative version of the polar sine which works in any -dimensional space can be defined using the Gram determinant. The numerator is given as

where the superscript T indicates matrix transposition. In the case m = n, this is equivalent to the absolute value of the definition given previously.  Note that if   then the determinant will be of a singular  matrix, giving , because it is not possible to have  linearly independent vectors in -dimensional space.

Properties

Interchange of vectors

The polar sine changes sign whenever two vectors are interchanged, due to the antisymmetry of row-exchanging in the determinant; however, its absolute value will remain unchanged.

Invariance under scalar multiplication of vectors

The polar sine does not change if all of the vectors v1, ..., vn are scalar-multiplied by positive constants ci, due to factorization

If an odd number of these constants are instead negative, then the sign of the polar sine will change; however, its absolute value will remain unchanged.

Vanishes with linear dependencies

If the vectors are not linearly independent, the polar sine will be zero.  This will always be so in the degenerate case that the number of dimensions  is strictly less than the number of vectors .

Relationship to pairwise cosines
The cosine of the angle between two non-zero vectors is given by

using the dot product.  Comparison of this expression to the definition of the absolute value of the polar sine as given above gives:

which is the Pythagorean theorem.

History

Polar sines were investigated by Euler in the 18th century.

See also

 Trigonometric functions
 List of trigonometric identities
 Solid angle
 Simplex
 Law of sines
 Cross product and Seven-dimensional cross product
 Graded algebra
 Exterior derivative
 Differential geometry
 Volume integral
 Measure (mathematics)
 Product integral

References

External links 
 

Polytopes
Trigonometry